snRNA-activating protein complex subunit 4 is a protein that in humans is encoded by the SNAPC4 gene.

Model organisms 

Model organisms have been used in the study of SNAPC4 function. A conditional knockout mouse line, called Snapc4tm1a(KOMP)Wtsi was generated as part of the International Knockout Mouse Consortium program — a high-throughput mutagenesis project to generate and distribute animal models of disease to interested scientists — at the Wellcome Trust Sanger Institute.

Male and female animals underwent a standardized phenotypic screen to determine the effects of deletion. Twenty six tests were carried out on mutant mice and two significant abnormalities were observed. No homozygous mutant embryos were recorded during gestation and, in a separate study, no homozygous animals were observed at weaning. The remaining tests were carried out on adult heterozygous mutant animals and no further abnormalities were observed.

Interactions 

SNAPC4 has been shown to interact with SNAPC1, POU2F1 and SNAPC2.

References

Further reading 

 
 
 
 
 
 
 

Genes mutated in mice